The 7th arrondissement of Lyon is one of the nine arrondissements of the City of Lyon.

Geography 

Squares and streets 
 Rue de Créqui
 Rue Duguesclin
 Rue Garibaldi
 Rue de l'Université

Quarters 
 La Guillotière (northern part)
 Jean Macé
 Gerland

Cultural activities 
 Parc de Gerland
 Stade de Gerland

See also 
 Parc Sergent Blandan

References

External links 

 Official website